Cyrtosia is a genus of insects in the family Mythicomyiidae.

Species 
C. abragi – Cyrtosia aglota – Cyrtosia arabica – Cyrtosia canariensis – Cyrtosia chongorica – Cyrtosia cinerascens – Cyrtosia flavorufa – Cyrtosia geniculata – Cyrtosia gulperii – Cyrtosia injii – Cyrtosia jeanneli – Cyrtosia luteiventris – Cyrtosia marginata – Cyrtosia meridionalis – Cyrtosia namaquensis – Cyrtosia nigrescens – Cyrtosia nitidissima – Cyrtosia nubila – Cyrtosia obscuripes – Cyrtosia occidentalis – Cyrtosia opaca – Cyrtosia pallipes – Cyrtosia panemplio – Cyrtosia perfecta – Cyrtosia persica – Cyrtosia pruinosula – Cyrtosia pusilla – Cyrtosia separata – Cyrtosia serena – Cyrtosia stuckenbergi – Cyrtosia subnitens – Cyrtosia tetragramma – Cyrtosia zygophrys

References

External links 
 

 
 Cyrtosia at insectoid.info

Asiloidea genera
Mythicomyiidae